The AN/AAQ-37 Electro-optical Distributed Aperture System (DAS) is the first of a new generation of sensor systems being fielded on the Lockheed Martin F-35 Lightning II Joint Strike Fighter. DAS consists of six high-resolution infrared sensors mounted around the F-35's airframe in such a way as to provide unobstructed spherical (4π steradian) coverage and functions around the aircraft without any pilot input or aiming required.

The DAS provides three basic categories of functions in every direction simultaneously:

Missile detection and tracking (including launch point detection and countermeasure cueing) 
Aircraft detection and tracking (situational awareness IRST and air-to-air weapons cueing) 
Imagery for cockpit displays and pilot night vision (imagery displayed onto the helmet mounted display)

The F-35's DAS was flown in military operational exercises in 2011, has demonstrated the ability to detect and track ballistic missiles to ranges exceeding , and has also demonstrated the ability to detect and track multiple small suborbital rockets simultaneously in flight. The AN/AAQ-37 DAS is designed and produced by Northrop Grumman. 
The current sensors used in the system may have insufficient night acuity for pilots used to flying with night vision goggles (NVG), and are therefore augmented by an embedded NVG camera in the helmet. A DAS test system has also been used to track tank gun firing, but this is "not an F-35 requirement".

References

External links
 AN/AAQ-37 Distributed Aperture System (DAS) for the F-35

Military sensor technology
Northrop Grumman
Military equipment introduced in the 2010s